Falen may refer to:

 Falen Gherebi (born 1961), a Libyan held by the Americans in Guantanamo
 Falen Johnson, a Mohawk and Tuscarora from Six Nations of the Grand River enclaved in Canada; a playwright
 James E. Falen, an American professor of Russian
 Lake Fälen, Alpstein, Appenzell Innerrhoden, Switzerland; a mountain lake

See also

 
 Carel van Falens (1683–1733) Flemish artist
 Phalen
 Phalène
 Fallen (disambiguation)
 Fale (disambiguation)
 FAL (disambiguation)